Neoclytus englemani is a species of beetle in the family Cerambycidae. It was described by Giesbert in 1989.

References

Neoclytus
Beetles described in 1989